The first USS Honolulu (ID-1843) was a cargo ship that served in the United States Navy probably from 1918 to 1919.

Honolulu was built as SS Setos by Armstrong Whitworth Ltd., Newcastle upon Tyne, England, in 1905 on Order of the Deutsche Dampfschiffahrts-Gesellschaft Kosmos, a shipping company with lines from Germany to the west coast of South and North America. 1914 she searched for shelter at Honolulu.

She was taken over by the United States for World War I on 12 June 1917, transferred to United States Shipping Board ownership, renamed Itasca and assigned to United States Army service. Although she operated as a U.S. cargo transport with a U.S. Navy crew, there is no record of her commissioning. Her  name was changed to Honolulu on 26 July 1918.

Honolulus service included cargo cruises between the United States and various French ports.

U.S. Navy personnel were released from the ship in March 1919 and she was rejected for further U.S. Navy service on 2 April 1919. Honolulu was returned to the United States Shipping Board and sold on 26 January 1920.

Honolulu resumed commercial service, and was sold 1923 to Moore-McCormack. Renamed Commercial Trader she was assigned to their Gulf Line until 1934 scrapped. The Company used more ex-German ships. One was Commercial Pathfinder ex Osage ex German Serapis, a sistership of Setos, between 1920 and 1928 too in service of their Gulf Line, which 1914 stayed at San Francisco.

Notes

References

External links
Department of the Navy: Naval Historical Center Online Library of Selected Images: Civilian Ships: SS Honolulu (U.S. Cargo Ship, 1905); Formerly named Setos and Itasca. Possibly served as USS Honolulu (ID # 1843) during World War I.

World War I cargo ships of the United States
Ships built on the River Tyne
1905 ships
Cargo ships of the United States Navy